Devon County Cricket Club was formed in England on 26 November 1899, and first competed in the Minor Counties Championship in 1901. Their first appearance in List A cricket was in 1969, and in total they have played thirty-three matches, making five Gillette Cup, nineteen NatWest Trophy and nine Cheltenham & Gloucester Trophy appearances. On five occasions the county progressed to the third round of the competition: in 1999, 2000, 2002, 2003, and 2004. Minor counties teams were excluded from the competition from the 2006 season; Devon's last match was against Essex in the first round of the 2004 competition.

In their thirty-three List A matches, 101 players have represented Devon. Andrew Pugh has appeared the most times for the county, playing in eighteen matches, closely followed by Nick Folland, who made sixteen appearances. Robert Dawson recorded the highest score in List A cricket for Devon, scoring 139 runs against Cumberland in 2002. Dawson, who played 64 first-class matches for Gloucestershire is Devons's leading run-scorer, having scored 492 runs in his thirteen appearances for the county. Andrew Procter's fourteen wickets for the county is the most by any player, but Robert Healey has the best bowling figures, having taken six wickets against Hertfordshire in his only match in 1969. Andrew Hele, who appeared for Devon on six occasions, has claimed the most dismissals as wicket-keeper, taking eight catches and making two stumpings. Ten non-English players have appeared for Devon; Australia's Braddon Green and Stuart MacGill, Malaysia's Arul Suppiah, New Zealand's Roger Twose, Pakistan's Agha Zahid and Aqeel Ahmed, South Africa's JP Duminy and Vernon Philander and Wales' Kevin Barrett and Steve Tomlinson.

The players in this list have all played at least one List A match. Devon cricketers who have not represented the county in List A cricket are not included in the list. Players are initially listed in order of appearance; where players made their debut in the same match, they are initially listed by batting order. Players in bold have played first-class cricket.

Key

List of players

List A captains

Notes

References

Devon County Cricket Club

Devon
Cricketers